The Castro Rocks are several rocks in Richmond, California protruding from the waters in San Francisco Bay between Castro Point and Red Rock Island.The rocks lie almost directly under the Richmond-San Rafael Bridge (I-580).

Name

The rocks are named after Don Víctor Castro, a local rancho-era land owner. They are shown as "Castro Rocks" on an 1850 survey map of the San Francisco Bay area made by Cadwalader Ringgold.

Harbor seals
Castro Rocks are the home of many harbor seals, which lie on them to rest and sunbathe. The rocks are the largest harbor seal rookery in the northern San Francisco Bay and the second largest in the Bay Area itself. There are also sometimes sea lions on the rocks. The rock's Harbor Seals also frequent Mowry Slough, Brooks Island, Yerba Buena Island, and Mare Island.

The seals at this location have high levels of toxic pollutants including the DDT, PCBs, PBDEs, PFOS, PFOA, and mercury.

References

External links
Castro Rocks page
SFSU Tagging - Photos

Geography of Richmond, California
Islands of Contra Costa County, California
Islands of San Francisco Bay
Islands of Northern California
Landforms of Contra Costa County, California
Rock formations of California